The Towering Inferno is a 1974 American disaster film directed by John Guillermin and produced by Irwin Allen, featuring an ensemble cast led by Paul Newman and Steve McQueen. It was adapted by Stirling Silliphant from the novels The Tower (1973) by Richard Martin Stern and The Glass Inferno (1974) by Thomas N. Scortia and Frank M. Robinson. In addition to McQueen and Newman, the cast includes William Holden, Faye Dunaway, Fred Astaire, Susan Blakely, Richard Chamberlain, O.J. Simpson, Robert Vaughn, Robert Wagner, Susan Flannery, Gregory Sierra, Dabney Coleman, and Jennifer Jones in her final role.

The Towering Inferno was released theatrically on December 16, 1974. The film received generally positive reviews from critics, and earned around $203.3 million, taking place as the highest-grossing film of 1974. It was nominated for eight Academy Awards, including Best Picture, winning three; Best Song, Best Cinematography, and Best Editing.

Plot
Architect Doug Roberts returns to San Francisco for the dedication of the Glass Tower, which he designed for developer James Duncan. During testing, an electrical short starts an undetected fire on the 81st floor just after another such short occurs in the main utility room. Upon learning this, Roberts sees the wiring is inadequate and suspects that Roger Simmons, the electrical subcontractor and Duncan's son-in-law, cut corners. Roberts confronts Simmons, who feigns innocence.

During the dedication ceremony, chief of public relations Dan Bigelow turns on all the tower's lights, but Roberts orders them shut off to reduce the load on the electrical system. Smoke is seen on the 81st floor, and the San Francisco Fire Department is summoned. Roberts and engineer Will Giddings go to the 81st floor, where Giddings is fatally burned pushing a guard away from the fire. Roberts reports the fire to Duncan, who is courting Senator Gary Parker for an urban renewal contract and refuses to order an evacuation.

SFFD Chief Michael O'Halloran arrives and forces Duncan to evacuate the guests from the Promenade Room on the 135th floor. Simmons admits to Duncan that he cut corners to bring the project back under budget and suggests other subcontractors did likewise. Fire overtakes the express elevators, killing a group whose elevator stops on the engulfed 81st floor. Bigelow and his girlfriend Lorrie are killed when a separate fire traps them in the Duncan Enterprises offices on the 65th floor. Lisolette Mueller, a guest being wooed by con man Harlee Claiborne, rushes to the 87th floor to check on a deaf mother and her two children. Security Chief Jernigan rescues the mother, but a ruptured gas line explodes and prevents Doug and the rest of the group from following. The explosion destroys one of the emergency stairwells which they must traverse to reach an exit door leading to a service elevator which can take them to the 134th floor, below the Promenade Room. They await firemen sent to blow up hardened cement blocking their access.

As firemen begin to bring the fire under control on floor 65, the electrical system fails, deactivating the passenger elevators; O'Halloran must rappel down the elevator shaft to safety. As firemen ascend to free the blocked door at the Promenade Room, an explosion on the 104th floor destroys a section of the remaining emergency stairwell, blocking the last means of escape from the floors above. After the stuck door is freed, thus reuniting Lisolette and the children with Roberts and the others, Simmons ignores the advice of the firemen and makes a futile attempt to escape down the stairwell, but is fought back by the flames and is forced to retreat.

An attempt at a helicopter rescue fails when two women run up to the aircraft, causing the pilot to try to evade them, crashing and setting the roof ablaze. A Navy rescue team attach a breeches buoy between the Promenade Room and the roof of the adjacent 102-story Peerless Building, and rescue a number of guests, including Patty Simmons, Duncan's daughter. Roberts rigs a gravity brake on the scenic elevator, allowing one trip down for twelve people, including Roberts' fiancée Susan Franklin, Lisolette, and the children saved earlier by her and Robert's efforts in the stairwell. An explosion near the 110th floor throws Lisolette from the elevator to her death and leaves the elevator hanging by a single cable, but O'Halloran rescues the elevator with a Navy helicopter.
 
As fire reaches the Promenade Room, a group of men led by Simmons attempts to commandeer the breeches buoy which is subsequently destroyed in an explosion, killing Simmons, Senator Parker and several other men. In a last-ditch strategy, O'Halloran and Roberts blow up water tanks atop the Tower with plastic explosives. Most of the remaining party-goers appear to survive as water rushes through the ruined building, extinguishing the flames.

Harlee Claiborne, in shock upon hearing of Lisolette's death, is given her cat by Jernigan. Duncan consoles his grieving daughter and promises that such a disaster will never happen again. Roberts accepts O'Halloran's offer of guidance on how to build a fire-safe skyscraper. O'Halloran drives away, exhausted.

Cast

Production

Development
In April 1973, it was announced that Warner Bros., whose then production chief was John Calley, paid $350,000 for the rights to Richard Martin Stern's The Tower, prior to that book's publication. This amount was larger than originally reported – the book had been the subject of a bidding war between Warner Bros., 20th Century Fox and Columbia Pictures: Columbia dropped out when the price reached $200,000 and Warner Bros. offered $390,000. Irwin Allen, who just had a big success with a disaster movie, The Poseidon Adventure (1972), was at Fox and persuaded that studio to make a higher offer when the book was sold to Warner Bros.

Eight weeks later Fox was submitted a novel, Thomas N. Scortia and Frank M. Robinson's The Glass Inferno that was published the following year, which Allen says had "the same sort of characters, the same locale, the same story, the same conclusion." They bought the novel for a reported fee of $400,000.

Allen was concerned that two films about a tall building on fire might cannibalize each other, remembering what happened in the 1960s when rival biopics about Oscar Wilde, with Oscar Wilde and The Trials of Oscar Wilde in 1960 and Jean Harlow, with Magna Media Distribution's Harlow and Paramount Pictures's Harlow in 1965, were released. He convinced executives at both studios to join forces to make a single film on the subject. The studios issued a joint press release announcing the single film collaboration in October 1973. Stirling Silliphant, who had written The Poseidon Adventure, would write the script and Allen would produce. It was decided to split costs equally between the studios, but the film would be made at Fox, where Allen was based. Fox would distribute in the US and Canada, and Warner Bros. outside those territories. Warner Bros. also handled the worldwide television distribution rights. Incidents and character names were taken from both novels.

The total cost for the film was US$14,300,000.

Casting
Several actors who appeared in small roles, including John Crawford, Erik Nelson, Elizabeth Rogers, Ernie Orsatti, and Sheila Matthews, had previously appeared in The Poseidon Adventure which Allen also produced (Allen and Matthews were husband and wife). Additionally, Paul Newman's son, Scott, played the acrophobic fireman afraid to rappel down the elevator shaft.

Lead actors Steve McQueen and Paul Newman were each paid $1million.

Although famed for his dancing and singing in musical movies, Fred Astaire received his only Oscar nomination for this film. He also won both a BAFTA Award and Golden Globe Award for his performance.

Filming
Principal photography took place over 14 weeks. Guillermin says that Newman and McQueen were very good to work with and added considerably to their roles.

Music
The score was composed and conducted by John Williams, orchestrated by Herbert W. Spencer and Al Woodbury, and recorded at the 20th Century Fox scoring stage on October 31 and November 4, 7 and 11, 1974. The original recording engineer was Ted Keep.

Source music in portions of the film includes instrumental versions of "Again" by Lionel Newman and Dorcas Cochran, "You Make Me Feel So Young" by Josef Myrow and Mack Gordon, and "The More I See You" by Harry Warren and Mack Gordon.

A snippet of a cue from Williams’ score to Cinderella Liberty (1973) titled 'Maggie Shoots Pool' is heard in a scene when William Holden's character converses on the phone with Paul Newman's character. It is not the recording on the soundtrack album but a newer arrangement recorded for The Towering Inferno. An extended version is heard, ostensibly as source music in a deleted theatrical scene sometimes shown as part of a longer scene from the TV broadcast version.

One of the most sought-after unreleased music cues from the film is the one where Williams provides low-key lounge music during a party prior to the announcement of a fire. O'Hallorhan orders Duncan to evacuate the party; the music becomes louder as Lisolette and Harlee are seen dancing and Duncan lectures son-in-law Roger. Titled "The Promenade Room" on the conductor's cue sheet, the track features a ragged ending as Duncan asks the house band to stop playing. Because of this, Film Score Monthly did not add this cue to the expanded soundtrack album.

The Academy Award-winning song "We May Never Love Like This Again" was composed by Al Kasha and Joel Hirschhorn and performed by Maureen McGovern, who appears in a cameo as a lounge singer and on the score's soundtrack album, which features the film recording plus the commercially released single version. Additionally, the theme tune is interpolated into the film's underscore by Williams. The song's writers collaborated on "The Morning After" from The Poseidon Adventure, an Oscar-winning song which was also recorded by McGovern, although hers was not the vocal used in that film.

The first release of portions of the score from The Towering Inferno was on Warner Bros. Records early in 1975 (Catalog No. BS-2840)

 "Main Title" (5:00)
 "An Architect's Dream" (3:28)
 "Lisolette And Harlee" (2:34)
 "Something For Susan" (2:42)
 "Trapped Lovers" (4:28)
 "We May Never Love Like This Again" – Kasha/Hirschhorn, performed by Maureen McGovern (2:11)
 "Susan And Doug" (2:30)
 "The Helicopter Explosion" (2:50)
 "Planting The Charges – And Finale" (10:17)

A near-complete release came on the Film Score Monthly label (FSM) on April 1, 2001 and was produced by Lukas Kendall and Nick Redman. FSM's was an almost completely expanded version remixed from album masters at Warner Bros. archives and the multi-track 35mm magnetic film stems at 20th Century Fox. Placed into chronological order and restoring action cues, it became one of the company's biggest sellers; only 4000 copies were pressed and it is now out of print.

Reports that this soundtrack and that of the film Earthquake (1974), also composed by Williams, borrowed cues from each other are inaccurate. The version of "Main Title" on the FSM disc is the film version. It differs from the original soundtrack album version. There is a different balance of instruments in two spots, and in particular the snare drum is more prominent than the album version which also features additional cymbal work. Although the album was not a re-recording, the original LP tracks were recorded during the same sessions and several cues were combined. The film version sound was reportedly better than the quarter-inch WB two-track album master. Although some minor incidental cues were lost, some sonically 'damaged' cues – so called due to a deterioration of the surviving audio elements – are placed at the end of the disc's program time following the track "An Architect's Dream" which is used over the end credits sequence.

 "Main Title" (5:01)
 "Something For Susan" (2:42)
 "Lisolette and Harlee" (2:35)
 "The Flame Ignites" (1:01)
 "More For Susan" (1:55)
 "Harlee Dressing" (1:37)
 "Let There Be Light" (:37)
 "Alone At Last" (:51)
 "We May Never Love Like This Again (Film Version)" – Maureen McGovern (2:04)
 "The First Victims" (3:24)
 "Not A Cigarette" (1:18)
 "Trapped Lovers" (4:44)
 "Doug's Fall/Piggy Back Ride" (2:18)
 "Lisolette's Descent" (3:07)
 "Down The Pipes/The Door Opens" (2:59)
 "Couples" (3:38)
 "Short Goodbyes" (2:26)
 "Helicopter Rescue" (3:07)
 "Passing The Word" (1:12)
 "Planting The Charges" (9:04)
 "Finale" (3:57)
 "An Architect's Dream" (3:28)
 "We May Never Love Like This Again (Album Version)" – Maureen McGovern (2:13)
 "The Morning After (Instrumental)" (2:07)
 "Susan And Doug (Album Track)" (2:33)
 "Departmental Pride and The Cat (Damaged)" (2:34)
 "Helicopter Explosion (Damaged)" (2:34)
 "Waking Up (Damaged)" (2:39)

Release
The Towering Inferno was released in theatres on December 14, 1974, in United States and Canada by 20th Century Fox, and internationally by Warner Bros.

Top billing
McQueen, Paul Newman, and William Holden all wanted top billing. Holden was refused, his long-term standing as a box office draw having been eclipsed by both McQueen and Newman. To provide dual top billing, the credits were arranged diagonally, with McQueen lower left and Newman upper right. Thus, each appeared to have "first" billing depending on whether the credit was read left-to-right or top-to-bottom. This was the first time this "staggered but equal" billing was used in a movie, although it had been considered earlier for the same two actors regarding Butch Cassidy and the Sundance Kid (1969) until McQueen turned down the Sundance Kid role. McQueen is mentioned first in the film's trailers. In the cast list rolling from top to bottom at the film's end, however, McQueen and Newman's names were arranged diagonally as at the beginning; as a consequence, Newman's name is fully visible first there.

Reception

Critical response
The Towering Inferno received generally positive reviews from critics and audiences alike upon its release. The film has an approval rating of 67% based on 36 reviews with an average rating of 6.4/10 on Rotten Tomatoes. The site's consensus states: "Although it is not consistently engaging enough to fully justify its towering runtime, The Towering Inferno is a blustery spectacle that executes its disaster premise with flair." Metacritic gave the film a score of 69 based on 11 reviews, indicating "generally favorable reviews."

Roger Ebert of the Chicago Sun-Times gave the film three out of four stars and praised it as "the best of the mid-1970s wave of disaster films." Variety praised the film as "one of the greatest disaster pictures made, a personal and professional triumph for producer Irwin Allen. The $14 million cost has yielded a truly magnificent production which complements but does not at all overwhelm a thoughtful personal drama." Vincent Canby of The New York Times wrote that the film is "overwrought and silly in its personal drama, but the visual spectacle is first rate. You may not come out of the theater with any important ideas about American architecture or enterprise, but you will have had a vivid, completely safe nightmare." Pauline Kael, writing for The New Yorker, panned the writing and characters as retreads from The Poseidon Adventure, and further wrote, "What was left out this time was the hokey fun. When a picture has any kind of entertainment in it, viewers don't much care about credibility, but when it isn't entertaining we do. And when a turkey bores us and insults our intelligence for close to three hours, it shouldn't preen itself on its own morality."

Gene Siskel of The Chicago Tribune gave the film two-and-a-half stars out of four, calling it "a stunt and not a story. It's a technical achievement more concerned with special effects than with people. That's why our attitude toward the film's cardboard characters is: let 'em burn."

Filmink called it "brilliant fun."

Box office
The film was one of the biggest grossing films of 1975 with theatrical rentals of $48,838,000 in the United States and Canada. In January 1976, it was claimed that the film had attained the highest foreign film rental for any film in its initial release with $43 million and went on to earn $56 million. When combined with the rentals from the United States and Canada, the worldwide rental is $104,838,000.

The film grossed $116 million in the United States and Canada and $203 million worldwide.

Awards and nominations

See also 
 List of American films of 1974
 Skyscrapers in film
 List of firefighting films
 "Disco Inferno", a song inspired by a scene in the film in which a discothèque catches fire
 555 California Street

References

Sources

Further reading
 
 </ref>

External links

1974 films
1970s action drama films
1970s disaster films
1970s American films
20th Century Fox films
Warner Bros. films
American disaster films
Films scored by John Williams
Films about firefighting
Films based on American thriller novels
Films based on multiple works
Films directed by John Guillermin
Films produced by Irwin Allen
Films set in San Francisco
Films shot in San Francisco
Films that won the Best Original Song Academy Award
Films whose cinematographer won the Best Cinematography Academy Award
Films whose editor won the Best Film Editing Academy Award
Films featuring a Best Supporting Actor Golden Globe winning performance
Films with screenplays by Stirling Silliphant
1974 drama films
Films about high-rise fires
1970s English-language films